Levi Ankeny (August 1, 1844March 29, 1921) was a Republican United States Senator from the state of Washington.

He was born in Buchanan County, Missouri near St. Joseph, but crossed the plains to Oregon in 1850 with his parents and settled in Portland. He attended the rural schools and later Kingsley Academy in Portland.

He worked in business in Lewiston, Idaho; Orofino, Idaho; and Florence, Idaho. He also became the mayor of Lewiston. He moved to Walla Walla, Washington and engaged in banking. He was appointed a member of the Pan-American Exposition Commission and became its chairman.

In 1902 he was elected as a Republican to the United States Senate, and served from March 4, 1903 to March 3, 1909. He failed to be renominated in 1908. He was chairman of the Committee on Coast and Insular Survey (Fifty-eighth and Fifty-ninth Congresses).

In 1867 he married Mary Jane (Jennie) Nesmith, daughter of Oregon Senator James W. Nesmith: they had five children.
Ankeny was member in Freemason order in Willamette Lodge No. 2, Portland, Oregon in 1866. He would later join Walla Walla Lodge No. 7 in 1878. He was also a member of Walla Walla Chapter No. 1, Royal Arch Masons, Washington Commandery No. 1, Knights Templar, Lawson Consistory, Ancient Accepted Scottish Rite and El Kalif Shrine in Spokane, Washington.

He worked in banking in Walla Walla until his death on March 29, 1921 and was interred at the Masonic Cemetery.

He is the namesake of the town of Ankeny, Washington.

References

External links

1844 births
1921 deaths
People from Buchanan County, Missouri
Washington (state) Republicans
Republican Party United States senators from Washington (state)
People from Lewiston, Idaho
Mayors of places in Idaho